Mushroom hunting, mushrooming, mushroom picking, mushroom foraging, and similar terms describe the activity of gathering mushrooms in the wild, typically for culinary use, though medicinal and psychotropic uses are also known. This practice is popular throughout most of Europe, Australia, Japan, Korea, parts of the Middle East, and the Indian subcontinent, as well as the temperate regions of Canada and the United States.

Identifying mushrooms 

Morphological characteristics of the caps of mushroom, such as those illustrated in the accompanying chart, are essential for correct visual mushroom identification.

Numerous field guides on mushrooms are available and recommended to help distinguish safe, edible mushrooms from the many poisonous or inedible species.

A spore print is a mushroom identification technique commonly used by mycologists and mushroom hunters to help identify the genus of a specimen and differentiate between similar looking species.

Knowing where and when to search for mushrooms is an important identification skill that takes practice. Most mushroom species require specific conditions. For example, some species only grow at the base of a certain type of tree. Finding a desired species that is known to grow in a certain region can be a challenge.

Safety and misidentification 

Mushroom hunting can be associated with significant health risks if it is done without caution since many mushrooms that are safe for consumption have lethally poisonous lookalikes. Even if consuming a poisonous mushroom does not result in death, some can still cause permanent organ damage. Mushroom poisoning kills an average of seven people every year in the United States and sickens thousands more.

Common safety advice requires that:
 Only positively identified mushrooms should be eaten, and if one cannot positively identify a mushroom they should assume it to be poisonous and not consume it.
 Mushrooms should be identified a second time during preparation, and cooked unless it can be verified that the species can be eaten raw.
 Mushroom types should not be combined.
 A sample of any mushroom not well-experienced with should be retained for analysis in case of poisoning.
 Familiarity with information about deadly mushrooms that are look-alikes of edible ones is mandatory, as "deadly twins" differ regionally,
 When picking mushrooms in an unfamiliar region, e.g. in a foreign country or in an area a considerable distance from one's usual foraging sites, it is mandatory to exercise great caution even with mushrooms that are positively identified as edible based on prior experience. Mushroom guides explaining local species should be studied thoroughly.
 Mushrooms should not be gathered that are difficult to identify. This applies especially to the mushrooms of the genus Amanita and Cortinarius and "little brown mushrooms".
 Only a small amount should be consumed the first time a new species is tried. People react differently to different mushrooms, and all mushroom species can cause an adverse reaction in a few individuals, even the common champignon.

Commonly misidentified/confused mushrooms 

Many mushroom guidebooks call attention to similarities between species, especially significant if an edible species is similar to, or commonly confused with, one that is potentially harmful.

Examples:
 False chanterelles (Hygrophoropsis aurantiaca), as the name suggests, can look like real chanterelles (Cantharellus cibarius). Real chanterelles do not have sharp gills, but rather blunt veins on the underside. False chanterelles are considered edible, but unpleasant tasting. Only mild symptoms have been reported from consuming them, and they are not considered to be poisonous. The Jack O'Lantern mushroom is also often mistaken for a chanterelle, and it is potently toxic.
 False morels (Gyromitra spp. and Verpa spp.) resemble true morels. False morels have caps attached at the top of the stalk, while true morels have a honeycombed cap and a single, continuous hollow chamber within.
 Immature Chlorophyllum molybdites can be confused with edible Agaricus and Macrolepiota mushrooms.
 Scleroderma citrinum and immature Amanitas may resemble immature puffballs. The puffballs can be identified by cutting one in half and looking for a dark reticulated gleba or the articulated, nonhomogeneous structures of a gilled mushroom, respectively.
 Highly poisonous Conocybe filaris and some Galerina species can resemble and grow alongside hallucinogenic Psilocybe species.

Little brown mushrooms 

"Little brown mushrooms" (or LBMs) refers to a large number of small, dull-coloured agaric species, with few uniquely distinguishing macromorphological characteristics. As a result, LBMs typically range from difficult to impossible for mushroom hunters to identify. Experienced mushroom hunters may discern more subtle identifying traits that help narrow the mushroom down to a particular genus or group of species, but exact identification of LBMs often requires close examination of microscopic characteristics plus a certain degree of familiarity or specialization in that particular group.

For mycologists, LBMs are the equivalent of LBJs ("little brown jobs") and DYCs ("damned yellow composites") that are the bane of ornithologists and botanists, respectively.

"Big white mushroom" (or BWM) is also sometimes used to describe groups of difficult to identify larger and paler agarics, many of which are in the genus Clitocybe.

Psychotropics 

The Amanita muscarias psychotropic properties have been traditionally used by shamans in Siberia in their rituals. However, its use for such purposes is very rare today, despite the mushroom's abundance and in part because of its severe side effects.

The Psilocybe semilanceata is more sought after for its hallucinogenic properties. It is more popular for recreational use than A. muscaria due to its reduced side effects. The use of P. semilanceata may be hindered by its small size, requiring larger quantities to take effect and being hard to spot.

Other Psilocybe species are abundant in the American south and west, as well as Mexico, where they have been used by traditional shamans for centuries. In the west, mushroom pickers may frequent cow pastures looking for psilocybes. This can be dangerous, as many species can grow in pastures and amateurs often misidentify psilocybes. 
 Amanita muscaria (Мухомор Красный [Mukhomor Krasniy] - Red Fly-Killer; Fly Agaric, Toadstool)
 Psilocybe semilanceata (Псилоциба Сосочковидная [Psilotsiba Sosochkovidnaya] - Nipple-Like Psylocybe; Liberty Cap)

Consumption of poisonous species 
There are treatments to reduce or eliminate the toxicity of certain (but not all) poisonous species to the point where they may be edible. For instance, false morels are deadly when eaten raw or incorrectly prepared, but their toxins can be reduced by a proper method of parboiling. Prepared in this way, this mushroom is widely used and considered a delicacy in many European countries, although recent research suggests that there may still be long-term health consequences from eating it.

Regional importance 

British enthusiasts enjoy an extended average picking season of 75 days compared to just 33 in the 1950s.
In Japan, particular mushroom types are hunted, with particular importance given to delicacies such as the Matsutake mushroom.
In Slavic countries and Baltic countries, mushroom picking is a common family activity. “The Russians for absolutely bananas for fungus. Mushrooming is a commonplace tradition there, not the hallowed turf of the academic or connoisseur.” After a heavy rain during the mushroom season whole families often venture into the nearest forest, picking bucketfuls of mushrooms, which are cooked and eaten for dinner upon return (most often in omelettes with eggs or fried in butter) or alternatively dried or marinated for later consumption. In Southern Lithuania mushroom hunting is considered a "national sport". They even host a Mushroom Festival ("Grybų šventė") in Varėna including a mushroom hunting championship. 
In the United States, mushroom picking is popular in the Appalachian area and on the west coast from San Francisco Bay northward, in northern California, Oregon and Washington, and in many other regions.

Festivals 
The popularity of mushroom picking in some parts of the world has led to mushroom festivals. The festivals are usually between September and October, depending on the mushrooms available in a particular region. Festivals in North America include:
Bamfield, British Columbia – Bamfield Fungus Festival
Berwyn, Illinois – Houby Festival
Boyne City, Michigan – Annual National Morel Mushroom Festival
 Buena Vista, Colorado – Buena Vista Heritage's Mushroom Festival
Cedar Rapids, Iowa, Czech Village – Houby Days Festival
Eugene, Oregon – Mushroom Festival
Girdwood, Alaska – Fungus Fair
Kennett Square, Pennsylvania – Mushroom Festival
Lake Quinault Lodge in Washington's Olympic National Forest – Quinault Rain Forest Mushroom Festival
Madisonville, Texas – Mushroom Festival
Mendocino County (North of San Francisco) – Mushroom Festival
Muscoda, Wisconsin – Morel Mushroom Festival
New Plymouth, Taranaki, New Zealand – Mushroom Ball
Richmond, Missouri – Mushroom Festival
Telluride, Colorado – Telluride Mushroom Festival
Washington's Long Beach Peninsula – Wild Mushroom Celebration

Radiation 
Nuclear fallout from the Chernobyl disaster is an important issue concerning mushroom picking in Europe. Due to the wide spread of their mycelium, mushrooms tend to accumulate more radioactive caesium-137 than surrounding soil and other organisms. State agencies (e.g. Bellesrad in Belarus) monitor and analyze the degree of radionuclide accumulation in various wild species of plants and animals. In particular, Bellesrad claims that Svinushka (Paxillus ssp.), Maslenok (Suillus ssp.), Mokhovik (Xerocomus ssp.), and Horkushka (Lactarius rufus) are the worst ones in this respect. The safest one is Opyonok Osyenniy (Armillaria mellea). This is an issue not only in Poland, Belarus, Ukraine and Russia: the fallout also reached western Europe, and until recently the German government discouraged people gathering certain mushrooms.

The situation is treated with black humor in some Russian jokes.

Commonly gathered mushrooms 

A large number of mushroom species are favored for eating by mushroom hunters.  The king bolete is a popular delicacy. Sulphur shelf (also known as "chicken mushroom" and "chicken of the woods") is often gathered because it occurs in bulk, recurs year after year, is easily identified, and has a wide variety of culinary uses. Pine mushrooms, chanterelles, morels, oyster mushrooms, puffballs and polypores are among the most popular types of mushrooms to gather, most of these being fairly simple to properly identify by anyone with practice. Much more care, education, and experience is typically required to make a positive identification of many species, however, and as such, few collect from more dangerous groups, such as Amanita, which include some of the most toxic mushrooms in existence.

Commonly gathered species, grouped by their order taxa, are as follows:
mushroom species mentioned in each group are listed at the end of the paragraph using the following convention:
Latin name (common English names, if any).

Agaricaceae 
The genus Macrolepiota, usually Macrolepiota procera, and, to a lesser extent, Macrolepiota rhacodes are highly regarded, especially in Europe, being very palatable and very large, with specimens of M. procera as high as one metre being reported.

 Agaricus bisporus (table or button mushroom) are an extremely common variety of mushroom and can be found at most grocery stores. Sales of this mushroom in 1996 reached $209 million in Canada. Another well known mushroom known as the portobello is a large brown strain of this fungus.
Coprinus comatus (shaggy ink cap) decomposes into ink, and hence are prepared soon after picking and only young specimens are collected. While being a general mushroom hunting guideline, the avoidance of specimens growing in areas with high pollution is especially important with this family, as it is a very effective pollutant absorber.
 Macrolepiota procera (parasol mushroom)

Amanitaceae 
While the family of amanitas are approached with extreme caution, as it contains the lethal Amanita phalloides and Amanita virosa, those confident in their skills often pick the Amanita rubescens, which is highly prized in Europe and to a much lesser extent in Russia, accounted by some not to superior taste, but to its relation to the Amanita caesarea, which is not found in Russia, but was considered a delicacy worthy of the emperor in Ancient Rome.
 Amanita caesarea (Caesar's mushroom)
 Amanita rubescens (European blusher)

Boletaceae 

This order is often viewed as the order of "noble" mushrooms, containing few poisonous species, identifiable with relative ease, and having superior palatability. The most notable species is the Boletus edulis, the "mushroom king", an almost legendary, relatively rare mushroom, edible in almost any (even raw) form, and commonly considered the best-tasting mushroom. (It is common to confuse the Russian name, literally "white mushroom", with champignons, often known in English as "white mushrooms".)
 Boletus edulis (Hřib Smrkový, Dubák, Borowik szlachetny, Porcino, King Bolete, Cep, Steinpilz)

The genus Leccinum includes two well-known mushroom species named after the trees they can usually be found next to. The Leccinum aurantiacum (as well as the Leccinum versipelle), found under aspen trees, and the Leccinum scabrum (as well as the L. holopus), found under birch trees. The latter species, are significantly different in cap colour only. Both types are very sought after, being highly palatable and more common than the B. edulis.
 Leccinum aurantiacum (red-capped scaber stalk)
 Leccinum scabrum (birch bolete)

The genus Suillus, characterised by its slimy cap, is another prized mushroom, the Suillus luteus and Suillus granulatus being its most common varieties, and while abundant in some parts of Eurasia, is a rare occurrence in others. It is easy to identify and very palatable.
 Suillus (klouzek, slippery Jack, butter mushroom)

The genus Xerocomus is generally considered a less desirable (though mostly edible) mushroom group, due to common abundant mould growth on their caps, which can make them poisonous. The Xerocomus badius, however is an exception, being moderately sought after, especially in Europe. Some scientific classifications now consider species in the genus Xerocomus as members of Boletus.
 Xerocomus (mossiness mushroom)
 Xerocomus badius (hřib hnědý)

Cantharellaceae 

The Cantharellus cibarius is a common and popular mushroom in Europe. It is edible and highly palatable. It is very rarely infested by worms or larvae, has a unique appearance, and when rotting, the decomposed parts are easily distinguishable and separable from those that are edible.
 Cantharellus cibarius (chanterelle, yellow chanterelle, pfifferling)

Craterellus cornucopioides and Craterellus tubaeformis are also very popular mushrooms, and dry well.

Helvellaceae 

The Gyromitra esculenta is considered poisonous, but can be consumed if dried and stored for over a year according to Slavic literature. It can be used to supplement or replace morel (see Morchellaceae below) mushrooms, while Western literature claims that even the fumes of the mushroom are dangerous. It is similar to morels both in appearance and palatability.
 Gyromitra esculenta (false morel, beefsteak morel, lorchel)

Morchellaceae 

The morel, Morchella esculenta is highly prized in Western Europe, India and North America. It is significantly less prized in Slavic countries where it is considered marginally edible with mediocre palatability. Boiling the mushroom and discarding the water is often recommended.
 Morchella esculenta (morel, yellow morel)

Lactarius 

Members of the genus Lactarius, as the name suggests, lactate a milky liquid when wounded and are often scoffed upon by Western literature. The Lactarius deliciosus is however regarded as one of the most palatable mushrooms in Slavic culture, comparable to the Boletus edulis. Also considered as similarly palatable are the species Lactarius necator and particularly Lactarius resimus. Thermal treatment may however be necessary in some cases. The Lactarius pubescens has a less appealing, bitter taste.
 Lactarius deliciosus (saffron milk-cap)
 Lactarius necator (black pepper cap)
 Lactarius pubescens (wooly milk-cap)
 Lactarius resimus (pepper cap)

Russulaceae 

The Russula family includes over 750 species of mushroom. They are one of the most common and abundant mushrooms in Eurasia. Their cap colours can be red, brown, yellow, blue and green. Due to their prevalence, large shape and bright colours, they can be easily spotted. The Russula vesca species, one of the many red-capped varieties, is one of the most common, is reasonably palatable and can be eaten raw.  The edible Russulas have a mild taste, compared to many inedible or poisonous species that have a strong hot or bitter taste. (However, this is not a defining feature of all poisonous mushrooms, as deadly poisonous Amanita phalloides, Amanita virosa and many other poisonous mushrooms have mild tastes.) The Russula emetica (the sickener) is known to cause gastrointestinal upset and has a very hot taste. Due to their abundance they may be regarded as an inferior mushroom for hunting. They may be eaten if parboiled.
 Russula vesca (Russula)

Tricholomataceae 

 Armillaria (honey mushroom, shoestring rot). The genus Armillaria, with the popular species A. gallica and A. mellea, being so similar that they are rarely differentiated, are palatable, highly abundant mushrooms. Generally found on decaying tree stumps, they grow in very large quantities and are one of the easier mushrooms to spot and identify.
 Pleurotus ostreatus (oyster mushroom). It is the most commonly picked tree-dwelling mushroom and is often also artificially cultivated for sale in grocery stores. This sturdy mushroom can be quite palatable when young. Growing these mushrooms at home can be a profitable enterprise and some Russians engage in the activity.

 Tricholoma magnivelare is a prized mushroom in North America. British Columbia exports large quantities of this mushroom overseas to Asia where it is in high demand.
Tricholoma matsutake - = syn. T. nauseosum, is a rare red pine mushroom that has a very fine aroma. Its fragrance is both sweet and spicy. They grow under trees and are usually concealed under fallen leaves and the duff layer. The mushroom forms a symbiotic relationship with the roots of a limited number of tree species. In Japan it is most commonly associated with Japanese red pine. However, in the Pacific Northwest it is found in coniferous forests of Douglas fir, noble fir, sugar pine, and Ponderosa pine. Farther south, it is also associated with hardwoods, namely tanoak and madrone forests. The Pacific Northwest and other similar temperate regions along the Pacific Rim also hold great habitat producing these and other quality wild mushrooms. In 1999, N. Bergius and E. Danell reported that Swedish (Tricholoma nauseosum) and Japanese matsutake (T. matsutake) are the same species. The report caused the increased import from Northern Europe to Japan because of the comparable flavor and taste. Matsutake are difficult to find and are therefore very expensive. Moreover, domestic productions of Matsutake in Japan have been sharply reduced over the last fifty years due to a pine nematode Bursaphelenchus xylophilus, and it and it has influenced the price a great deal. The annual harvest of matsutake in Japan has since further decreased. The price for matsutake in the Japanese market is highly dependent on quality, availability and origin. The Japanese matsutake at the beginning of the season, which is the highest grade, can go up to $2000 per kilogram, while the average value for imported matsutake from China, Europe, and the United States is only about $90 per kilogram.

See also 

 List of mushroom dishes
Medicinal mushrooms

References

Further reading 
 100 Edible Mushrooms: With Tested Recipes(2007) 
 All That the Rain Promises, and More (1991) 
 Edible and Medicinal Mushrooms of New England and Eastern Canada (2009)  (1-55643-795-1)
 Edible Wild Mushrooms of North America: A Field-to-kitchen Guide (1992) 
 How to Identify Edible Mushrooms (2007) 
 Mushrooming Without Fear (2007) 
 Mushrooms Demystified: A Comprehensive Guide to the Fleshy Fungi (1986) 
 Mushrooms of Northeastern North America (1997) 
 North American Mushrooms: A Field Guide to Edible and Inedible Fungi (2006) 
 The Mushroom Rainbow: Only the most delicious or deadly mushrooms sorted by color (2011)  (0986940909)

External links 
 Edible and Medicinal Mushrooms of Maine and New England, USA
 Edible Wild Mushrooms of North America, David Fischer
 Mushroom identification database
 Mushroom picking in British Columbia, Canada (Government site)
 Mushroom tour in the Carpathians, Ukraine
 MushroomExpert.com (Reference site)
 The Association of Foragers: An international association for teachers of mushroom foraging.
 The Roger Phillips app for identifying fungi.
 Why Are Poles So Obsessed With Mushroom Picking? from Culture.pl

Slavic culture
Non-timber forest products
Hunting
Harvest
Foraging

de:Speisepilz#Sammeln und Bestimmen
ja:キノコ#キノコ狩り